Tartar Invasion is a 1917 Hungarian drama film directed by Michael Curtiz.

Cast

Emmi Kosáry
Béla Bátori
Artúr Fodor 
Rezsö Inke 
Kálmán Somogyi 
Camilla von Hollay 
József R. Tóth 
Ernö Király 
Jenõ Medgyaszay 
Sándor Szõke 
LajosSzalkai 
Iván Cseh

External links

 Summary

1917 films
Films directed by Michael Curtiz
1917 drama films
Hungarian silent short films
Hungarian black-and-white films
Austro-Hungarian films
Hungarian drama films
Silent drama films